The Royal Hotel in Riebeek Kasteel is the oldest licensed hotel of the Western Cape and was built in 1862. This now fully restored heritage building is one of the few hotels left of that particular colonial era of South Africa. Famous visitors in history were Jan Smuts and Daniel Malan, both from the Riebeek Valley and both prime ministers of South Africa during troubled times. In 2006 southafrica.org placed The Royal as only hotel on the list of "the 50 most fabulous places to visit in SA". According to them it has the longest stoep (veranda) south of the Limpopo.

Sources

External links
Royal Riebeek

Hotel buildings completed in 1862
Hotels in South Africa
Hotels established in 1862
Tourism in the Western Cape
Buildings and structures in the Western Cape
1862 establishments in the Cape Colony
19th-century architecture in South Africa